Kepler-38 is a binary star system in the constellation Lyra. These stars, called Kepler-38A and Kepler-38B have masses of 95% and 25% solar masses respectively. The brighter star is spectral class G while the secondary has spectral class M. They are separated by 0.147 AU, and complete an eccentric orbit around a common center of mass every 18.8 days.

Planetary system
In 2012, a circumbinary Neptune-sized planet was found transiting the brighter star. Follow-up radial velocity measurements did not give sufficient information to constrain the mass of the planet. The planet was confirmed via transit duration variation method.

It is likely that additional planets in the habitable zone exist, including rocky terrestrial planets, according to simulations of the formation of the Kepler-38 system; furthermore, the orbits of any such planets are probably stable.

See also
Kepler-16
Kepler-34
Kepler-35

References

Lyra (constellation)
Eclipsing binaries
G-type main-sequence stars
1740
Planetary transit variables
Circumbinary planets
Planetary systems with one confirmed planet